Krishna  is a 1996 Indian Tamil-language romantic drama film written and directed by Raja Krishnamoorthy. The film stars Prashanth, Kasthuri and Heera, while S. A. Rajkumar composed the film's music. The film received mixed reviews.

Plot

Krishna (Prashanth) and Tara (Heera) have been friends in the college. Tara is in love with Krishna but he does not reciprocate her love. Meanwhile, Lizy (Kasthuri) arrives as a new college girl and is bothered by groups of boys, including Vikram. Krishna fights the goons for her and falls in love. Lizy has had contempt for men and does not trust and falls in love with difficulty.

One evening, in revenge for Lizy, Vikram gives poison in the glass of Tara. Soon after Krishna leads her, he encounters an accident. The doctor admits that Tara is pregnant with Krishna's child, which confuses Krishna's brother Dharmaraj (Nassar), his wife Anandhi (Rekha) and Lizy. Angry, she goes home with her parents, (Kitty) and (Sathyapriya). Krishna is looking for her and falls on the family.

Vikram confesses to Tara that he has gotten her pregnant and captures her. Krishna comes to the rescue. Suddenly, Krishna is attacked but defends himself by falling from the window. Tara returns to the hospital for treatment while Krishna and Lizy unite.

Cast
Prashanth as Krishna 
Kasthuri as Lizy
Heera as Tara
Nassar as Assistant commissioner Dharmaraj
Rekha as Anandhi
Sathyapriya as  Lizy's mother
Chinni Jayanth as Daves
Kitty as Lizy's father
Pandu as Police constable

Soundtrack

The music was composed by S. A. Rajkumar.

References

External links 
 

Indian romantic drama films
1996 films
1990s Tamil-language films
1996 romantic drama films